Abdul Latif  (born 1912 - died 1991) was an Indian politician from the Indian National Congress. He was Member of the Parliament of India, representing Tripura in the Rajya Sabha from 1956 to 1962.

References

1912 births
1991 deaths
Tripura politicians
Indian National Congress politicians
Rajya Sabha members from Tripura
20th-century Bengalis